Blaze Fielding (ブレイズ・フィールディング), better known as just Blaze, is a player character in Sega's Streets of Rage (Bare Knuckle) series of beat 'em up games. Introduced in the original Streets of Rage in 1991, she is playable in all four games, starting out as an ex-police officer-turned-vigilante in the first game and becoming a private detective by the third game. Blaze is a master of judo who helps her companions, Adam Hunter and Axel Stone, defeat the crime syndicate boss Mr. X throughout all three games.

Originally the least strong but fastest of the first game's roster, Blaze later became an all-round fighter of the series as well as a favorite of many. The characters of Mona and Lisa from Streets of Rage (Onihime and Yasha in Bare Knuckle) and Mace from Fighting Force are based on her. Blaze Fielding has been well received by the gaming press, noted for being one of the earliest female heroes in video games.

Appearances

Video games
Blaze Fielding made her debut in 1991's Streets of Rage (SoR) as a 21-year-old, low-rank officer in the Police Department of an unnamed large American city. Blaze is the leader of the three young cops who quit the city's corrupt police force in order to settle the rampage that has plagued the city and find out who is behind those events. Along with Adam Hunter and Axel Stone, she manages to defeat the syndicate leader (later named Mr. X) in his own headquarters.

In Streets of Rage 2 (1992), set one year later, Blaze, who has moved out of the city and became a dance instructor, discovers along with Axel and Adam's kid brother "Skate" that Adam has been kidnapped by Mr. X, who was believed to be dead in the previous battle, in order to lure Axel and Blaze to him in retaliation for his prior defeat. She and Axel set out to rescue their friend with Skate and a professional wrestler Max Thunder who too is one of Axel's friends. They manage to reach the hidden headquarters of the Syndicate on an isolated island and defeat Mr. X once again and free Adam in the end.

In Bare Knuckle III, the Japanese language version of Streets of Rage 3 (1994), Blaze, along with Axel, has rejoined the police force after the events of Streets of Rage 2. During the events of Bare Knuckle III, Axel and Blaze are being assigned to the leading two cases that will actually reveal to be interconnected: an explosion in the Wood Oak city that could be related to the Syndicate's activities, and the disappearance of General Petrov that could lead to a war between nations. They are being assisted by Adam, Skate and a mysterious ex-researcher Dr. Zan. The English language version of Streets of Rage 3, which features a slightly altered storyline, has Blaze stay in the city after the events of Streets of Rage 2 and become a private detective. When informed by Dr. Zan that the next victim of the Syndicate's evil scheme will be her old friend, the Chief of Police, she immediately sets up a task force to go to his rescue.

In 2018, Blaze was announced to return in Streets of Rage 4. She is featured as one of the five playable characters in the game, alongside Axel, Adam and newcomers Cherry Hunter and Floyd Iraia.

Other media
Blaze appears in the Streets of Rage comic written by Mark Millar, originally serialized in Sonic the Comic in 1993 and later published as Streets of Rage: Bad City Fighters. In the bonus story "Facts of Life" from Sonic the Poster Mag, Blaze and her friends Axel, Max and Skates are abducted by corrupt NYPD officers, but before they can be executed a young honest cop releases her and she rescues the others. The main story shows how Blaze and the others quit the force and became vigilante crime-fighters.

She also appears in the Streets of Rage 2 non-canon novella that came with Sega Force magazine, written by Mat Yeo in 1993. In it, Blaze is a CIA agent who, following the events of the first game, returned to Washington after both Axel and Adam fell in love with her and she was unable to choose. In the five years between the events of the two games, she joins an elite intelligence service STRIKE, before reuniting with Axel to help him rescue Adam and defeat Mr. X (with Blaze killing his ninja bodyguard Shiva).

In 2016, Sega announced Blaze is planned to appear in their film and television adaptations of the Streets of Rage series.

Character design and gameplay

As disclosed in Read-Only Memory's Sega Mega Drive/Genesis: Collected Works, Blaze had originally began as a Hong Kong Chinese kung-fu lady named Pink Typhoon in the design document for D-SWAT, a game that became Bare Knuckle / Streets of Rage. While Blaze always has brown hair in-game, the main screen, portrait and ending scene in the first game show her with black hair. She wears, along with boots and gloves, a bright red headband, red leather jacket and red miniskirt in the first game; a red bra and miniskirt in the sequel; and the silver version of it in third game (red in Japan). Backbone Entertainment's rejected pitch for a reboot of Street of Rage featured an updated look of Blaze based on her earlier appearances. In Dotemu's Streets of Rage 4, Blaze is "still a beautiful thirty something bad ass woman."

Blaze is a weak-but-fast character in the first Streets of Rage, but has become the series' "all-rounder" by the second game. She mostly uses her powerful legs to fight and is a judo expert, giving her a more powerful, body-slamming throw move than the other characters. With her balanced stats and good techniques, Blaze is commonly regarded as the best of the playable characters in Streets of Rage 2 and Streets of Rage 3. Her special techniques in the later two games are a cartwheel kick Embukyaku (ダンスキック) and a chi blast attack Kikoushko (カイパーム, "Wind Blast" in SoR3); her Hishousouzan (フライングタロンスラッシュ, "Flying Double Cut" in SoR3) is a forward somersault to stun enemies with her fists. Her special moves have been compared to these of Street Fighter characters Ryu and Guile. She is the only character that performs a special weapon move in SoR2 (a double-hit with a knife).

Blaze is the only character that kept her idle move (runs her hand through her hair) through the series. Her jump kick animation was censored in the U.S. version Streets of Rage 2 as to not glimpse her underwear, which surprised the Japanese development team. In the first Streets of Rage, stage-boss twin pair Onihime and Yasha, or Mona and Lisa in the English version, are palette swaps of Blaze's game sprite (they look distinctively different from Blaze in Streets of Rage 3). Blaze from Core Design's abortive project of Streets of Rage 4 / Streets of Rage 3D for the Saturn was turned into Mace Daniels in Fighting Force (1997) when this game has been turned into a standalone title; Mace has still continued to be named 'Blaze' in Judgement Force, the pre-release version of Fighting Force. In another canceled Street of Rage 4 project, for the Dreamcast in 1999, Blaze was to be replaced by a female ninja character named Erie and using a similar fighting style.

Reception
Blaze Fielding was well received, noted for being one of the first strong female heroines in video games, especially on Sega platforms and in the beat 'em up genre, with Violet Berlin describing Blaze as "a welcome change" when she "spoke out for the girls" in 1993. According to Brazilian Gamers in 1993, Blaze has already been "acclaimed by game maniacs as one of the muses of games;" German Mega Fun called her the strongest "video game babe" after Chun-Li, and Italian Game Power opined Blaze was superior to Chun-Li, even as she was "not as beautiful as Final Fight 2's Maki." GameZone's Nick Akerman ranked Blaze as the third toughest female character in gaming in 2008, as did the staff of MeriStation in 2015. IGN Spain put up Blaze and Tyris Flare from Golden Axe to represent the beat 'em up genre in their 2013 list of top ten "classic game heroines". TechRaptor's Georgina Young included this "fan favorite" on her 2015 list of top six "feminist female protagonists" in video games. The staff of Retro Gamer chose Blaze as one of the classic "ingredients needed to make the ultimate scrolling fighter" as the "Player 2 character" (Player 1's being Mike Haggar from Final Fight).

She was also noted for her sex appeal, in particular for the upskirt animation frames, removal of which in America was one early instances of sexual content censored in video games. Famitsu described it as a Japanese fan "dogma" of "Blaze=panties" while discussing the Western censorship. Electronic Gaming Monthly named her as the "Hottest Video Game Babe" of 1993. Digital Press Karl Youngman featured Blaze in his article "Classic Babes in Videogames" as a representative of a 'biker chick' trope, opining she has best legs in video games and stating that after seeing her he "didn't care if I ever saw another 'real' girl again," and a Famitsu reviewer admitted to "worship" Blaze for both her fighting technique and her sexiness. In 2011, GamesRadar's Jim Sterling recalled this "16-bit stunner" as "one of the sexiest sprites ever."

Computer & Video Games compared the "gorgeous" Blaze to their own Yvette Nicholls, and USgamer's Jeremy Parish speculated Final Fight 3s Lucia might have been "Capcom's answer to Streets of Rage favorite Blaze, wearing her short shorts and a tiny vest over a crop-top as she leaps and kicks foes." Italian magazine Mega Console compared Blaze to the superheroine Wonder Woman. Hip-hop producer and DJ Justin Smith better known as Just Blaze was inspired by Streets of Rage.

References

Beat 'em up characters
Dancer characters in video games
Female characters in video games
Fictional American people in video games
Fictional American police officers
Fictional Central Intelligence Agency personnel
Fictional female martial artists
Fictional judoka
Fictional martial artists in video games
Fictional police officers in video games
Sega protagonists
Streets of Rage
Video game characters introduced in 1991
Vigilante characters in video games